Cole Howard is a fictional character from the CBS soap opera The Young and the Restless. The role was originated by N.P. Schoch in 1980 and was dropped in 1981, before being brought back and portrayed by J. Eddie Peck from 1993 to 1999.

Storylines
Cole is the son of the late Eve Howard, who originally thought Victor Newman fathered her son from an affair they had when she worked as his secretary while he was married to his first wife, Julia Newman. In 1980, Cole was seen as a child on a recurring basis as Victor provided a trust fund in young Charles' name.

After Victoria Newman divorced Ryan McNeil, Victoria set her sights on the new ranch hand, Cole Howard. When Victoria's father, Victor, was presumed dead in a car accident, Cole offered his support to Victoria's grieving mother, Nikki Abbott. Victoria, unaware of Cole's friendship with Nikki, told him she wanted to sleep with him. Cole turned her down and began an affair with Nikki. When Victoria found out about this, she told Cole that she loved him. Cole then wrote to his mother, Eve, informing her that he had fallen for Victor's daughter. Unbeknownst to Cole, Eve had had an affair with Victor years ago, and had been keeping a secret from him; Cole was Victor's son. Distraught that her son was romantically involved with his half-sister, Eve rushed to Genoa City, determined to stop their wedding. However, before she could tell her son the truth, she suffered a massive stroke that left her in a coma. Cole and Victoria eloped to Las Vegas.

When they returned, Victor and Nikki were horrified that Cole and Victoria had wed. Victor told Cole that he was his father, forcing Cole and Victoria to annul the marriage. It was soon revealed that Victor in fact wasn't Cole's father after all, and Cole and Victoria remarried. They had a daughter they named Eve Nicole Howard, who died several days after birth.

Apart from some minor problems, and Cole's brief flirtation with Nina, Cole and Victoria's marriage remained strong for the next three years. While Victoria was out of town for a while, Cole developed an attraction to Ashley Abbott. The two shared a few kisses at work. When Victoria returned, she was shocked to see Cole and Ashley kissing through the window. She left Cole and moved back in with Nikki, who had separated from Victor. Victoria and Ashley began to compete for Cole's affection, with Ashley ultimately winning.

After divorcing Victoria, Cole married Ashley. When Ashley went to Paris on a business trip later that year, Victoria began trying to seduce Cole, which was unsuccessful. When Ashley returned, she began pressuring Cole to have a child with her. Cole wasn't interested, so he accepted a teaching position in England and divorced Ashley.

References

External links
 Cole Howard @ soapcentral.com

The Young and the Restless characters
Television characters introduced in 1980
Male characters in television
Fictional writers